The Galerie Konrad Fischer is a German contemporary art gallery. It was founded in 1967 by Dorothee and Konrad Fischer in Düsseldorf, in a disused alley in the center of the city. Its first exhibition presented the work of Carl Andre to European audiences. The gallery has focussed on minimal art, conceptual art and arte povera since its founding.

The gallery has exhibited contemporary artists including Bernd and Hilla Becher, Hanne Darboven, Wolfgang Laib, Jim Lambie, Sol LeWitt, Bruce Nauman, Manfred Pernice, Thomas Schütte, Gregor Schneider, Robert Smithson, and Paloma Varga Weisz.

In 2007 the gallery opened an additional space in Berlin.

The state of North Rhine - Westphalia acquired 250 works from the estate of the gallery's founders in 2014.

References

Art galleries established in 1967
Minimalism